San Nicolao is a railway station on the Monte Generoso railway, a rack railway that connects Capolago with the summit of Monte Generoso in the Swiss canton of Ticino. The station has a passing loop and a small shelter.

The station is served by the following passenger trains:

References

External links 
 

Railway stations in Ticino